Bigga than Ben is a 2008 British black comedy film written and directed by Suzie Halewood. The film is based on the 1999 Russian novel of the same name.

It was released on 10 October 2008 in the United Kingdom and 18 November 2008 in the United States. It stars Ben Barnes, Andrei Chadov, Ovidiu Matesan and Hero Fiennes-Tiffin.

Plot
This dark comedy from the UK, is a tale of two selfish, wayward young Russian backpackers who come to London in an attempt to amass an easy fortune.

But it's not too long before Spiker and Cobakka realize that legally, they aren't going to get very far. So, aided by the dodgy Artash they learn to shoplift from supermarkets, rip off banks, joyride on the London Underground and turn mobile phones into crack cocaine.

Cast
Ben Barnes as Cobakka
Andrei Chadov as Spiker
Ovidiu Matesan as Artash
Hero Fiennes-Tiffin as Spartak

Critical reception
Bigga than Ben received generally favourable reviews from critics. The review aggregator Rotten Tomatoes reported that 60% of critics gave the film positive reviews. The film was nominated for Best Narrative Film at Austin Film Festival, played Best of the Fest at Edinburgh, Won Best Comedy Film at Los Angeles DIY FF and made The Times Top 100 Films of that year.

Cosmo Landesman in The Sunday Times gave the film four stars and said the film was "Dark, funny, charming, fast, immoral, decadent  and delightful. The best double act buddies since Butch Cassidy & the Sundance Kid."

London's Time Out said, "Makes Dirty Pretty Things look like a government advisory documentary... street-smart, non-PC and very funny" and also gave the film four stars.

References

External links
 
 
 

2008 films
2000s crime comedy films
British crime comedy films
British black comedy films
2008 black comedy films
Films based on Russian novels
Films set in London
2008 comedy films
2000s English-language films
2000s British films